Rhacophorus pseudomalabaricus, also known as Anaimalai flying frog, false Malabar gliding frog, and false Malabar tree frog, is a species of frog in the family Rhacophoridae. It is endemic to the Anaimalai Hills, a part of the southern the Western Ghats in the Tamil Nadu and Kerala states, India.

Description
Adult males measure  and adult females  in snout–vent length. The eyes are protruding. The supra-tympanic fold is distinct. The fingers and toes are extensively webbed; the webbing is light yellow. Juveniles have distinctive black zebra-like pattern that becomes fainter in adults, resembling venation of leaf; the background colour is green.

Habitat and conservation
Rhacophorus pseudomalabaricus has been recorded in tropical moist evergreen forest, in secondary forests on the fringe of abandoned cardamom plantation, in a marshy area beside a perennial stream outside a cardamom plantation, and near an artificial water hole between the evergreen forest and tea plantation. Specimens have been recorded both in lower canopy and understorey vegetation and on the ground. Reproduction takes place on vegetation overhanging marshy areas, ponds, and streams.

This species is known from at least two protected areas, Indira Gandhi National Park and Parambikulam Tiger Reserve. Outside the protected areas, it is threatened by habitat loss caused by conversion of forests to other uses as well as by timber extraction.

References

External links

pseudomalabaricus
Frogs of India
Endemic fauna of the Western Ghats
Amphibians described in 2000
Taxa named by Karthikeyan Vasudevan
Taxonomy articles created by Polbot